Aquilonifer spinosus is an extinct species of arthropod from the Silurian period. It is known from a single fossil specimen found in the Wenlock Series Lagerstätte of Herefordshire, England, in rocks about 430 million years old. The 1 cm long specimen is a stem-group mandibulate, not directly related to any living species. The many-legged, eyeless adult has ten unusual tethered appendages, interpreted as juveniles attached to the parent, in a unique form and previously unknown brooding behaviour.

Etymology 
"Aquilone" is Italian for "toy kite", and the suffix "–ifer" means "to carry". "Spinosus" means "spiny" in Latin. Its discoverers have nicknamed it "the kite runner".

References 

Silurian arthropods of Europe
Silurian England
Fossils of England
Fossil taxa described in 2016